Islesboro Airport  is a town owned public use airport located one nautical mile (1.85 km) west of the central business district of Islesboro, a town in Waldo County, Maine, United States. This airport is included in the FAA's National Plan of Integrated Airport Systems for 2009–2013, which categorized it as a general aviation facility.

Facilities and aircraft 
It has one runway designated 1/19 with an asphalt surface measuring 2,400 by 50 feet (732 x 15 m). For the 12-month period ending August 10, 2008, the airport had 1,144 general aviation aircraft operations, an average of 95 per month.

References

External links 
 Aerial image as of 27 April 1997 from USGS The National Map
 

Airports in Maine
Transportation buildings and structures in Waldo County, Maine